Koen Daerden (born 8 March 1982) is a Belgian former professional football player and current coach, who works as sporting director for the youth or head of the youth department at Racing Genk.

Club career
Daerden was born in Tongeren. He started his senior career with K.R.C. Genk, where he became captain.

He signed a one-year contract with Club Brugge in June 2006 for a reported transfer fee of €4,000,000.

On 15 January 2010, Daerden joined Standard Liège from Club Brugge until June 2013. However, after a loan spell at Sint-Truiden, he was released in the summer of 2013 due to a lack of playing time.

After being on trial with Dutch side Willem II in the summer of 2013, Daerden eventually signed with Dutch Eerste Divisie side MVV Maastricht. On the last day of 2013, Daerden decided to retire from professional football as a result of sustained injuries.

International career
Daerden also played ten times for the Belgium national team.

Career statistics

International goals
Scores and results list Belgium's goal tally first, score column indicates score after each Daerden goal.

Honours
Genk
Belgian First Division: 2001–02
Belgian Cup: 1999–2000

Standard Liège
Belgian Cup: 2010–11

References

External links
 
 

Living people
1982 births
People from Tongeren
Belgian footballers
Footballers from Limburg (Belgium)
Association football wingers
Belgium international footballers
Belgium under-21 international footballers
Belgium youth international footballers
Belgian Pro League players
Eerste Divisie players
Club Brugge KV players
K.R.C. Genk players
MVV Maastricht players
Sint-Truidense V.V. players
Standard Liège players
Belgian expatriate footballers
Belgian expatriate sportspeople in the Netherlands
Expatriate footballers in the Netherlands